Cırkürd (also, Dzhyrkurd and Dzhyrkurt) is a village in the Goychay Rayon of Azerbaijan.

References 

Populated places in Goychay District